Le Pin-la-Garenne is a commune North of Bellême in the Orne department in north-western France.

See also
Communes of the Orne department

References

Pinlagarenne